William Medina (born 10 April 1968) is a Colombian judoka. He competed in the men's middleweight event at the 1988 Summer Olympics.

References

1968 births
Living people
Colombian male judoka
Olympic judoka of Colombia
Judoka at the 1988 Summer Olympics
Place of birth missing (living people)
Pan American Games medalists in judo
Pan American Games bronze medalists for Colombia
Judoka at the 1987 Pan American Games
Medalists at the 1987 Pan American Games
20th-century Colombian people